The A801 is a road in Scotland which runs from east of Polmont to the A705 near Whitburn that heads towards Livingston in the other direction.

The A801 provides a link from Junction 4 of the M8 to Junction 4 of the M9, creating easy access from traffic from Falkirk, Grangemouth or Stirling travelling to and from places in West Lothian like Livingston, Armadale or Bathgate. 

 

Roads in Scotland
Transport in West Lothian
Transport in Falkirk (council area)